The Finder or The Finders may refer to:

 The Finder (American TV series), an American procedural drama television series
 The Finder (film), a 2001 Australian film
 The Finders, a 1993 novel by British author Nigel Hinton
 Finders Keepers (Australian TV series) (also The Finder), an Australian children's television show

See also
 Finder (disambiguation)